Calasesia is a genus of moths in the family Sesiidae.

Species
Calasesia coccinea (Beutenmüller, 1898)

References

Sesiidae